Maoping is a town under the administration of Ebian Yi Autonomous County, Sichuan, China. , it has one residential community and 11 villages under its administration.

See also 
 List of township-level divisions of Sichuan

References 

Towns in Sichuan
Ebian Yi Autonomous County